Murarrie (formerly Mooraree) is an eastern riverside suburb in the City of Brisbane, Queensland, Australia. Queensport is a neighbourhood within Murarrie. Gibson Island is a neighbourhood within Murarrie and, despite its name, is no longer an island.

Geography 
Murarrie is located in the eastern suburbs on the southern bank of the Brisbane River. It is then bounded to the south-west and west by Wynnum Road, Creek Road, the Cleveland railway line, Barrack Road, Lytton Road, Colmslie Road (formerly Chemical Works Road) and then north to the river.

The Gateway Motorway passes through the suburb, entering from the south-east (Tingalpa) and exiting via the Sir Leo Hielscher Bridges (previously known as the Gateway Bridge) over the river to Eagle Farm.

Murarrie railway station is located on the Cleveland railway line of the Queensland Rail City network.

Murarrie has both residential and industrial sections. Brisbane's two newspapers, The Courier-Mail and The Sunday Mail, are published at News Corporation's printing facility in Murarrie.

History 
The district was originally known as Mooraree after Mooraree House, a home built by Christopher Porter in 1861. The name is thought to be mudherri, a word from the Yuggera language (Yugarabul dialect) meaning sticky or muddy. The name of the locality and the railway station were changed to Murarrie in 1907.

It is uncertain when the Queensport Hotel (now Queensport Tavern) was established; the hotel claims it was 1864, making it one of Brisbane's oldest continuously operated hotels. The present hotel building at 49 Gosport Road (now in the suburb of Hemmant) was constructed in 1890-1891 for publican Martin Kavanagh by Brisbane architect Charles McLay and was one of his first private commissions. It is listed on the Brisbane Heritage Register. The Lytton Hotel was operating in 1878 and Kavanagh bought the Lytton Hotel in 1879. Kavanagh had been living in the district growing sugarcane since at least 1874. Kavanagh's daughter Bridget continued to operate the Lytton Hotel when her father opened the Queensport Hotel.

The Queensland Freezing and Food Export Company established a meatworks at Queensport in 1881.

In 1889 Queensport Aquarium opened in Hemmant (the present-day location is Aquarium Avenue in Murarrie). It had a zoo, an aquarium and dance halls and other entertainments. Visitors arrived by riverboats until the 1893 flood during which the animals were rescued but the attractions were damaged closed down. It had closed by the late 1890s, but a dance hall continued to operate until 1901.

In 1900, Gibson Island was used as a burial site for some of the victims of the bubonic plague epidemic due to concerns that the bodies of the dead could infect the living, so there was an initial reluctance to bury the dead in normal cemeteries (cremation not being available in Queensland at that time). The Colmslie Plague Hospital had been rapidly constructed in Morningside to handle plague victims. The dead were transferred by boat to Gibson Island for burial. The bodies were wrapped in sheets soaked in carbolic acid and their coffins were filled with a mix of quicklime and water which has the effect of killing micro-organisms. The authorities carried out the burials quickly and family members could not be present nor visit the graves. The number and location of those graves are now unknown. The policy of burying the dead on Gibson Island was subsequently changed as it was felt to be inhumane.

In order to provide a straighter deeper channel in the lower reaches Brisbane River, it was decided in 1889 to relocate the mouths of creeks and eliminate all of islands by a combination of removal by dredging and incorporation as part of the river bank. Paringa Road now crosses the isthmus to provide access to the industrial facilities that were developed circa 1980s on the former island. A spur railway line (now abandoned) was also developed to the north of Paringa Road to provide these facilities with a link to the Cleveland railway line. The line terminated at  beside the Brisbane River. Sections of track are still visible along the route as at 2020.

Murarrie State School opened on 2 July 1928.

On 11 August 1975 Queensport and Gibson Island were officially designated as neighbourhoods within Murarrie by the Queensland Place Names Board.

St Clare's Anglican Church was dedicated on 11 August 1985 by Bishop Ralph Wicks. The church building was relocated from Primrose Parade, Wynnum, to 16 Penelope Street in Murrarie, where it was originally St Margaret's Anglican Church Hall which operated from 1964 to 1985. The closure of St Clare's was approved on 5 September 2009 by Archbishop Phillip Aspinall. It was subsequently redeveloped as housing.

The median age of the Murarrie population was 34 years of age, three years below the Australian median. 70.5% of people living in Murarrie were born in Australia, compared to the national average of 69.8%; the next most common countries of birth were New Zealand 4.9%, England 3.5%, South Africa 1.2%, Fiji 1.1%, Scotland 1%. 81.9% of people spoke only English at home; the next most common languages were 1% Hindi, 1% Mandarin, 0.9% Cantonese, 0.9% Vietnamese, 0.8% Korean.

Education 
Murarrie State School is a government primary (Prep-6) school for boys and girls at Garrett Street. In 2017, the school had an enrolment of 76 students with 8 teachers (5 full-time equivalent) and 9 non-teaching staff (5 full-time equivalent).

There are no secondary schools in Murarrie. The nearest secondary school is Balmoral State High School in Balmoral.

References

Further reading

External links

Suburbs of the City of Brisbane